Psalm 4 is the fourth psalm of the Book of Psalms, beginning in the English of the King James Version: "Hear me when I call, O God of my righteousness: thou hast enlarged me when I was in distress." In Latin, it is known as "Cum invocarem". The psalm is traditionally attributed  to David, but his authorship is not accepted by modern scholars. The message in the psalm is that the victories of sinners are only temporary, and that only repentance can bring true happiness.

The psalm forms a regular part of Jewish, Catholic, Lutheran, Anglican and other Protestant liturgies. It has often been set to music, including works in Latin by Michel Richard Delalande, Henry Desmarest and Marc-Antoine Charpentier.

Text

Hebrew Bible version 
The following is the Hebrew text of Psalm 4:

King James Version 
 Hear me when I call, O God of my righteousness: thou hast enlarged me when I was in distress; have mercy upon me, and hear my prayer.
 O ye sons of men, how long will ye turn my glory into shame? how long will ye love vanity, and seek after leasing? Selah.
 But know that the LORD hath set apart him that is godly for himself: the LORD will hear when I call unto him.
 Stand in awe, and sin not: commune with your own heart upon your bed, and be still. Selah.
 Offer the sacrifices of righteousness, and put your trust in the LORD.
 There be many that say, Who will shew us any good? LORD, lift thou up the light of thy countenance upon us.
 Thou hast put gladness in my heart, more than in the time that their corn and their wine increased.
 I will both lay me down in peace, and sleep: for thou, LORD, only makest me dwell in safety.

Context
Psalm 4 is traditionally attributed to David, but his authorship is not accepted by modern scholars. The psalm's Latin title is Cum invocarem.

The psalm's text is a reflection of David speaking to all sinners while addressing himself to Absalom. The message in the psalm is that the victories of sinners are only temporary and meaningless, and that only repentance can bring true happiness. It is a request to God for deliverance from past distresses.

This is the first psalm with a musical instrument, strings, mentioned in the title. There also was a 'selah' ending the previous psalm, Psalm 3. There is, however, no agreement what 'selah' meant. Popular modern views might include a pause, a reflection or a lifting. Poetically, if selah is a connection, it is as if David recited his Psalm 3, then paused and began to sing, continuing with his harp. The themes will be false and true worship, but also false and true satisfaction. 'They long for prosperity', David sings, but David has it and is more satisfied 'than when their grain and new wine abound'.

Many see a chiastic structure in the layout of this psalm.

Uses

Judaism
 
 Verse 5 is part of the prayers of the Bedtime Shema.
 Verse 7 is part of the Prayer for Sustenance recited on High Holidays.

New Testament
 Verse 4 is quoted in Ephesians .

Book of Common Prayer
In the Church of England's Book of Common Prayer, Psalm 4 is appointed to be read on the morning of the first day of the month.

Catholic
The psalm forms part of the Benedictine rite of the daily evening prayer Compline. After the Reform of the Roman Breviary by Pope Pius X it was only used on Sundays and Solemnities. In the Liturgy of the Hours it is part of Compline on the eve of Sunday and Solemnities.

Musical settings
While several composers set the whole Psalm 4, some writers and composers focused on the aspect of sleeping in peace, as a base for evening music.

Fanny Crosby wrote a hymn based on verse 8 in 1853, titled “An Evening Hymn", which she described as her first published hymn.

Heinrich Schütz composed a setting of a metred version in German, "Erhör mich, wenn ich ruf zu dir", SWV 100, published in 1628 in the Becker Psalter. Michel Richard Delalande wrote a great motet (S41) in Latin in 1692 for services celebrated in the royal chapel of Versailles. Henry Desmarest also wrote a great motet on the psalm. Marc-Antoine Charpentier composed around 1689 Cum invocarem exaudivit me, H. 198, for soloists, choir, flutes, strings and continuo. Desmarest, Nicolas Bernier, André Campra, wrote a great motet Cum invocarem exaudivit me. A plainsong version was included in H. B. Briggs and W. H. Frere's Manual of Plainsong published in 1902.

Max Drischner composed a setting of verses 7 and 9, combined with Psalm 74:16, as the final movement of his Tübinger Psalmen for voice, violin and organ, or choir, melody instrument and keyboard instrument, in 1948, titled "Ich liege und schlafe ganz mit Frieden".

References

External links 

 
 
  in Hebrew and English - Mechon-mamre
 Text of Psalm 4 according to the 1928 Psalter
 A psalm of David, when he fled from his son Absalom. / How many are my foes, LORD! / How many rise against me! (text and footnotes) United States Conference of Catholic Bishops
 Psalm 4:1 (introduction and text) biblestudytools.com
 Psalm 4 – Talking to God and Men enduringword.com
 Psalm 4 / Refrain: In peace I will lie down and sleep. Church of England
 Psalm 4 at biblegateway.com
 Hymns for Psalm 4 hymnary.org

004
Works attributed to David